Vlădeni may refer to several places in Romania:

 Vlădeni, a commune in Botoşani County
 Vlădeni, a commune in Dâmboviţa County
 Vlădeni, a commune in Ialomiţa County
 Vlădeni, a commune in Iaşi County
 Vlădeni, a village in Corlăteni Commune, Botoşani County
 Vlădeni, a village in Dumbrăviţa Commune, Braşov County
 Vlădeni, a village in Cernăteşti Commune, Buzău County